Henry Knollys (died 1583) was an English politician and diplomat.

He was a Member (MP) of the Parliament of England for Grampound in 1547, New Shoreham in 1563, Guildford in 1571 and Christchurch in 1572.

References

Henry
People of the Elizabethan era
Year of birth missing
1583 deaths
Politicians from Carlisle, Cumbria
Members of the pre-1707 English Parliament for constituencies in Cornwall
English MPs 1547–1552
English MPs 1563–1567
English MPs 1571
English MPs 1572–1583